Misha Kahn (born 1989) is an American designer and sculptor, known for assemblage. He incorporates refuse and found objects in his furniture and lighting designs. Kahn's style has been described as "disheveled, spontaneous maximalism".

Career 
Kahn graduated from Rhode Island School of Design (RISD) with a degree in furniture design in 2011. In 2012, he was a Fulbright Fellow at Bezalel Academy of Arts and Design in Tel Aviv, Israel. He was a fellow in 2013 at the Creative Glass Center of America at WheatonArts in Millville, New Jersey.

Kahn was featured in the Museum of Arts and Design's 2014 NYC Makers biennial. His first solo exhibition, Midden Heap, was at the Friedman Benda Gallery in 2016. He has since exhibited at the Whitney Museum of American Art, the Walker Art Center, Dallas Museum of Art, and High Museum of Art.

His work is found in numerous public collections such as Corning Museum of Glass (Corning, New York), and the Museum of Fine Arts, Houston (Houston, Texas). Collectors of his work include Kelly Wearstler and Peter Marino.

In 2023, Kahn was a contestant on The Exhibit: Finding the Next Great Artist, a reality TV series that aired on MTV and the Smithsonian Channel.

Personal life 
He was born in Duluth, Minnesota. He currently lives in the Bushwick neighborhood of Brooklyn, New York, with his boyfriend Nick Haramis.

Gallery

References

External links 

1989 births
Living people
Rhode Island School of Design alumni
People from Duluth, Minnesota
American designers